Connected: The Power of Six Degrees (alternate title: How Kevin Bacon Cured Cancer) is a 2008 documentary film by Annamaria Talas. It was first aired in 2009 on the Science Channel. The documentary introduces the audience to the main ideas of network science through the exploration of the concept of six degrees of separation.  It was awarded the 2009 AFI Award for Best Editing in a Documentary.

References 

Australian documentary films